Arctium tomentosum, commonly known as the woolly burdock or downy burdock, is a species of burdock belonging to the family Asteraceae. The species was described by Philip Miller in 1768.

Distribution
This species is native to Eurasia from Spain to Xinjiang Province in western China.  It is also naturalized in other parts of the world such as North America.

Description
Arctium tomentosum is a biennial herbaceous plant. The stem is erect, with ascending branches. Leaves are grayish white and quite felted, green and glabrous toward the stem. Basal leaves are petiolate. Leaf blade is heart-shaped, with rather denticulater margins. This species can be distinguished from related ones because the underside of the leaves is covered with white woolly hairs. Flowers and fruits appear from July to September.

Gallery

Bibliography
Kell DJ. 2006. Arctium Linnaeus, Sp. Pl. 2: 816. 1753; Gen. Pl. ed. 5, 357. 1754. In Flora of North America Editorial Committee (Eds.) Flora of North America North of Mexico, Vol. 21: Asteraceae. New York and Oxford.
Lopez-Vinyallonga S, Romaschenko K, Susanna A and Garcia-Jacas N. 2011. Systematics of the Arctioid group: Disentangling Arctium and Cousinia (Cardueae, Carduinae). Taxon 60(2): 539–554.
Pignatti S. - Flora d'Italia (3 voll.) - Edagricole - 1982
Tutin, T.G. et al. - Flora Europaea, second edition - 1993
Zangheri P. - Flora Italica (2 voll.) - Cedam - 1976

References

External links
 
 
 Catalogue of Life
 Tela botanica

tomentosum
Plants described in 1768
Taxa named by Philip Miller